During his career as a singer and composer, Pat Boone released 63 singles in the United States, mostly during the 1950s and early 1960s when Boone was a successful pop singer and, for a time, the second-biggest charting artist behind Elvis Presley according to Billboard. Boone has had over 25 singles reach the top 20 on the U.S. singles charts, including the number-one hits "Ain't That a Shame" (1955), "I Almost Lost My Mind" (1956), "Don't Forbid Me" (1957), "Love Letters in the Sand" (1957), "April Love" (1957), and "Moody River" (1961). "I'll Be Home" (1956) reached No. 1 in the UK. He set a Billboard record, which he still holds, for spending 220 consecutive weeks on the charts with one or more songs each week.

Boone also had several top 20 albums during this time, including the EP Four by Pat (1957) which peaked at No. 5 on the U.S. album charts, and his highest-charting album, Star Dust (1958), which reached No. 2. He also released two hit soundtracks for musical films in which he starred, April Love (1957) and State Fair (1962). Most of his records during the 1950s and 1960s were released on the Dot Records label.

Although Boone's last single release was in 1984, he has continued to regularly release both studio albums and compilation albums for six decades, in addition to several soundtracks and video albums. His post-1960s output has been on a variety of different labels and has increasingly focused on Christian music. A notable exception was his controversial 1997 album In a Metal Mood: No More Mr. Nice Guy, which featured Boone covering well-known hard rock and heavy metal songs such as "Stairway to Heaven", "Smoke on the Water" and "Crazy Train" in a jazz/ big band style. It reached No. 125 on the U.S. Billboard 200 album chart, thus becoming Boone's first album to chart in 35 years.

Albums

Studio albums

EPs

Soundtracks

Compilations

1964: The Gold Collection (The Gold Label)
1982: Best of Pat Boone (Prism Platinum)
1982: The Best of Pat Boone (MCA)
1986: Jivin' Pat (Bear Family)
1986: All the Hits (Topline)
1987: Love Letters (Dominion)
1990: Greatest Hits (Curb)
1990: The Best of Pat Boone: April Love (Delta)
1993: Love Letters in the Sand (Delta)
1994: Pat Boone (Bellaphon)
1994: More Greatest Hits (Varèse Sarabande)
1994: Remember (Eclipse)
1995: Greatest Hits (Bellaphon)
1995: Greatest Hymns (Curb)
1995: His Greatest Hits (Laserlight)
1996: The Best of Pat Boone (Hallmark)
1997: Pat Boone (Members Edition)
1997: Fifties: Complete (Bear Family)
1997: EP Collection (See For Miles Records)
1998: My God is Real: The Inspirational Collection (Varese)
1998: The Best of Pat Boone (Music Club)
1999: Hymns We Love (Universal Special Products)
1999: Golden Treasury of Hymns (The Gold Label)
1999: My Greatest Songs (IMS)
2000: Love Letters in the Sand (Hallmark)
2000: At His Best: Love Letters in the Sand (Castle Music)
2000: I Believe In Music (Acrobat)
2000: The Very Best of Pat Boone (Big Eye Music)
2000: 20th Century Masters - The Millennium Collection: The Best of Pat Boone (MCA)
2000: Best of the Best (Legacy)
2001: Blast from the Past: Pat Boone (Direct Source)
2001: Greatest Hits & Favorite Hymns (Goldies)
2001: Pat's 40 Big Ones (Connoisseur)
2002: On the Sentimental Side (MRA)
2002: Best Selection (Universal)
2002: Pat Boone Best Selection (Universal)
2002: The Ultimate Collection (Universal)
2003: Ultimate Legends: Pat Boone (Ultimate Entertainment)
2003: The Singles+ (BR Music)
2003: Pat Boone (Weton)
2004: Greatest Contemporary Christian Songs (Curb)
2004: Greatest Love Songs (Curb)
2004: Greatest Rock N' Roll Songs (Curb)
2004: Greatest Hits (Elap)
2004: Christmas with Pat Boone (Noel)
2004: I'll Be Home for Christmas (Christmas Legends)
2005: Remember You're Mine (Brentwood Records)
2005: Ready to Rock (Oak Records)
2005: Glory Train: The Lost Sessions (Oak Records)
2005: Platinum Collection (Platinum Entertainment)
2006: Best of Pat Boone (Platinum Disc)
2006: The Sixties (1960–1962) (Bear Family)
2006: Kid in the White Buckskin Shoes! (Canetoad International)
2007: Encore of Golden Hits (Musicpro)
2008: Gee Whittakers (Xtra)
2008: Sweet Hour of Prayer (Remember Records)
2008: Rock N Roll Legends (RNR Music)
2008: Ain't That a Shame (Hallmark)
2008: Pat's Great Hits (Hallmark)
2008: Pledging My Love (Hallmark)
2009: Pat Boone Rocks (Bear Family)
2009: My God Is Real (Delta Leisure Group)
2009: Spotlight on Pat Boone (Mbop Direct-Zone 5)

Singles
{| class="wikitable" style="text-align:center;"
! width="20" rowspan="2"| Year
! width="330" rowspan="2"| Titles (A-side, B-side)Both sides from same album except where indicated
! colspan="5"| Peak chart positions
! rowspan="2"| Album
|-
! width="40"| US
! width="40"| USAC
! width="40"| UK
! width="40"| USR&B
! width="40"| DE
|-
| 1953
| style="text-align:left"| "Until You Tell Me So"b/w "My Heart Belongs to You"
| —
| —
| —
| —
|
| style="text-align:left" rowspan="2"|Non-album tracks
|-
| 1954
| style="text-align:left"| "I Need Someone"b/w "Loving You Madly"
| —
| —
| —
| —
|
|-
|rowspan="5"| 1955
| style="text-align:left"| "Two Hearts"b/w "Tra-La-La"
| 16
| —
| —
| —
|
| style="text-align:left" rowspan="7"|Pat Boone
|-
|style="text-align:left"| "Ain't That a Shame"b/w "Tennessee Saturday Night"
| 1
| —
| 7
| 14
|-
| style="text-align:left"| "At My Front Door (Crazy Little Mama)" /
| 7
| —
| —
| 12
|
|-
| style="text-align:left"| "No Arms Can Ever Hold You"
| 26
| —
| —
| —
|-
|style="text-align:left"| "Gee Whittakers!"b/w "Take the Time"
| 19
| —
| —
| —
|-
|rowspan="10"| 1956
|style="text-align:left"| "I'll Be Home" /
| 4
| —
| 1
| —
|-
|style="text-align:left"| "Tutti Frutti"
| 12
| —
| —
| —
|
|-
|style="text-align:left"| "Just as Long as I'm with You" /
| 76
| —
| —
| —
|
| style="text-align:left" rowspan="2"|Non-album tracks
|-
| style="text-align:left"| "Long Tall Sally"
| 8
| —
| 18
| —
|
|-
| style="text-align:left"| "I Almost Lost My Mind" /
| 1
| —
| 14
| —
|
| style="text-align:left" rowspan="12"|Pat's Great Hits
|-
|style="text-align:left"| "I'm in Love with You"
| 57
| —
| —
| —
|-
| style="text-align:left"| "Friendly Persuasion" /
| 5
| —
| 3
| —
|-
| style="text-align:left"| "Chains of Love"
| 10
| —
| —
| —
|
|-
| style="text-align:left"| "Don't Forbid Me" /
| 1
| —
| 2
| 10
| 
|-
| style="text-align:left"| "Anastasia"
| 37
| —
| —
| —
|
|-
|rowspan="8"| 1957
| style="text-align:left"| "Why Baby Why" /
| 5
| —
| 17
| —
|
|-
| style="text-align:left"| "I'm Waiting Just for You"
| 27
| —
| —
| —
|-
|style="text-align:left"| "Love Letters in the Sand" /
| 1
| —
| 2
| 12
|
|-
| style="text-align:left"| "Bernardine"
| 14
| —
| —
| —
|-
| style="text-align:left"| "Remember You're Mine" /
| 6
| —
| 5
| —
|-
| style="text-align:left"| "There's a Gold Mine in the Sky"
| 14
| —
| —
| —
|
|-
| style="text-align:left"| "April Love" /
| 1
| —
| 7
| —
|
| style="text-align:left" rowspan="11"|Pat Boone Sings
|-
| style="text-align:left"| "When the Swallows Come Back to Capistrano" 
| 80
| —
| —
| —
|
|-
|rowspan="9"| 1958
| style="text-align:left"| "A Wonderful Time Up There" /
| 4
| —
| 2
| —
|
|-
| style="text-align:left"| "It's Too Soon to Know"
| 4
| —
| 7
| —
|
|-
|style="text-align:left"| "Sugar Moon" /
| 5
| —
| 6
| —
|
|-
|style="text-align:left"| "Cherie, I Love You"
| 63
| —
| —
| —
|
|-
| style="text-align:left"| "If Dreams Came True" /
| 7
| —
| 16
| —
|
|-
| style="text-align:left"| "That's How Much I Love You"
| 39
| —
| —
| —
|
|-
| style="text-align:left"| "For My Good Fortune" /
| 23
| —
| —
| —
|
|-
| style="text-align:left"| "Gee, But It's Lonely"
| 21
| —
| 30
| —
|
|-
| style="text-align:left"| "I'll Remember Tonight"b/w "The Mardi Gras March"
| 34
| —
| 18
| —
|-
|rowspan="7"| 1959
| style="text-align:left"| "With the Wind and the Rain in Your Hair" /
| 21
| —
| 21
| —
|
| style="text-align:left"|Pat Boone's Golden Hits
|-
|style="text-align:left"| "Good Rockin' Tonight"
| 49
| —
| —
| —
|
| style="text-align:left"|Non-album track
|-
|style="text-align:left"| "For a Penny" /
| 23
| —
| 19
| —
|
| style="text-align:left" rowspan="3"|Pat Boone's Golden Hits 
|-
| style="text-align:left"| "The Wang Dang Taffy-Apple Tango"
| 62
| —
| —
| —
|
|-
| style="text-align:left"| "'Twixt Twelve and Twenty"b/w "Rock Boll Weevil" (Non-album track)
| 17
| —
| 18
| —
|-
| style="text-align:left"| "Fools Hall of Fame"b/w "Brightest Wishing Star"
| 29
| —
| —
| —
|
| style="text-align:left"|Non-album tracks
|-
| style="text-align:left"| "Beyond the Sunset"b/w "My Faithful Heart" (Non-album track)
| 71
| —
| —
| —
|
| style="text-align:left"|Hymns We Love
|-
|rowspan="9"| 1960
|style="text-align:left"| "(Welcome) New Lovers" /
| 18
| —
| —
| —
|
| style="text-align:left" rowspan="3"|Pat Boone's Golden Hits
|-
|style="text-align:left"| "Words"
| 94
| —
| —
| —
|
|-
| style="text-align:left"| "Walking the Floor over You" /
| 44
| —
| 39
| —
|
|-
| style="text-align:left"| "Spring Rain”
| 50
| —
| —
| —
|
| style="text-align:left" rowspan="2"|Non-album tracks
|-
| style="text-align:left"| "Candy Sweet" /
| 72
| —
| —
| —
|-
|style="text-align:left"| "Delia Gone"
| 66
| —
| —
| —
|
| style="text-align:left"|Pat Boone - 1965
|-
| style="text-align:left"| "Dear John" /
| 44
| —
| —
| —
|
| style="text-align:left" rowspan="2"|Pat Boone's Golden Hits
|-
| style="text-align:left"| "Alabam"
| 47
| —
| —
| —
|
|-
| style="text-align:left"| "The Exodus Song (This Land Is Mine)"b/w "There's a Moon Out Tonight"
| 64
| —
| —
| —
|
| style="text-align:left"|Days of Wine and Roses
|-
|rowspan="6"| 1961
| style="text-align:left"| "Moody River"b/w "A Thousand Years"
| 1
| 4
| 18
| —
|
| style="text-align:left"|Moody River
|-
| style="text-align:left"| "Big Cold Wind"b/w "That's My Desire" (Non-album track)
| 19
| 5
| —
| —
|
| style="text-align:left" rowspan="2"|Pat Boone's Golden Hits
|-
| style="text-align:left"| "Johnny Will" /
| 35
| 10
| 4
|
| 2
|-
| style="text-align:left"| "Just Let Me Dream"
| 114
| —
| —
| —
|
| style="text-align:left"|Non-album track
|-
| style="text-align:left"| "Pictures in the Fire" /
| 77
| 15
| —
| —
|
| style="text-align:left" rowspan="2"|I'll See You in My Dreams
|-
| style="text-align:left"| "I'll See You in My Dreams"
| 32
| 9
| 27
| —
|
|-
|rowspan="8"| 1962
| style="text-align:left"|"Quando Quando Quando" /
| 95
| —
| 41
| —
|
| style="text-align:left" rowspan="2"|Non-album tracks
|-
| style="text-align:left"|"Willing and Eager"
| 113
| —
| —
| —
|
|-
| style="text-align:left"|"Speedy Gonzales"b/w "The Locket" (Non-album track)
| 6
| —
| 2
| —
| 1
| style="text-align:left"|Pat Boone's Golden Hits
|-
| style="text-align:left"| "Ten Lonely Guys" /
| 45
| 14
| —
| —
|
| style="text-align:left" rowspan="3"|Non-album tracks
|-
| style="text-align:left"| "Lover's Lane"
| —
| —
| —
| —
| 11
|-
| style="text-align:left"| "The Main Attraction"b/w "Always You and Me"
| —
| —
| 12
| —
|
|-
| style="text-align:left"| "White Christmas"b/w "Silent Night"
| —
| —
| 29
| —
|
| style="text-align:left"|White Christmas
|-
| style="text-align:left"| "Mexican Joe"b/w "In the Room" (from Ain't That a Shame)
| —
| —
| —
| —
|
| style="text-align:left"|Non-album tracks
|-
|rowspan="5"| 1963
| style="text-align:left"| "Meditation (Meditação)" /
| 91
| —
| —
| —
|
| style="text-align:left"|Non-album track
|-
| style="text-align:left"| "The Days of Wine and Roses"
| 117
| —
| —
| —
|
| style="text-align:left"|Days of Wine and Roses
|-
| style="text-align:left"| "Tie Me Kangaroo Down Sport"b/w "I Feel Like Crying"
| —
| —
| —
| —
|
| style="text-align:left"|Tie Me Kangaroo Down Sport
|-
| style="text-align:left"| "Mister Moon"b/w "Love Me" (Non-album track)
| —
| —
| —
| —
|
| style="text-align:left"|Ain't That a Shame
|-
| style="text-align:left"| "Some Enchanted Evening"b/w "That's Me"
| —
| —
| —
| —
|
| style="text-align:left" rowspan="5"|Non-album tracks
|-
|rowspan="4"| 1964
| style="text-align:left"| "Rosemarie"b/w "I Understand (Just How You Feel)"
| 129
| —
| —
| —
| 
|-
| style="text-align:left"| "Don't You Just Know It"b/w "Sincerely"
| —
| —
| —
| —
|
|-
| style="text-align:left"| "Beach Girl" /
| 72
| —
| —
| —
|
|-
| style="text-align:left"| "Little Honda"
| —
| —
| —
| —
| 44
|-
| rowspan="5"|1965
| style="text-align:left"| "Baby Elephant Walk"b/w "Say Goodbye"
| —
| —
| —
| —
|
| style="text-align:left"|Pat Boone - 1965
|-
| style="text-align:left"| "Crazy Arms"b/w "Pearly Shells" (from My 10th Anniversary with Dot Records)
| —
| —
| —
| —
|
| style="text-align:left"|The Golden Era of Country Hits
|-
| style="text-align:left"| "Time Marches On"b/w "Mickey Mouse"
| —
| —
| —
| —
|
| style="text-align:left"|Non-album tracks
|-
| style="text-align:left"| "I Love You So Much It Hurts"b/w "Meet Me Tonight in Dreamland"
| —
| —
| —
| —
|
| style="text-align:left"|Memories
|-
| style="text-align:left"| "A Man Alone"b/w "Run to Me, Baby"
| —
| —
| —
| —
|
| style="text-align:left"|Non-album tracks
|-
|rowspan="4"| 1966
| style="text-align:left"| "Five Miles from Home"b/w "Don't Put Your Feet in the Lemonade" (Non-album track)
| 127
| —
| —
| —
|
| style="text-align:left"|Wish You Were Here, Buddy
|-
| style="text-align:left"| "As Tears Go By"b/w "Judith"
| —
| —
| —
| —
|
| style="text-align:left"|Great Hits of 1965
|-
| style="text-align:left"| "It Seems like Yesterday"b/w "A Well Remembered, Highly Thought of Love Affair" (from I Was Kaiser Bill's Batman)
| —
| —
| —
| —
|
| style="text-align:left"|Memories
|-
| style="text-align:left"| "Wish You Were Here, Buddy"b/w "Love for Love" (Non-album track)
| 49
| 12
| —
| —
|
| style="text-align:left"|Wish You Were Here, Buddy
|-
| rowspan="4"|1967
| style="text-align:left"| "Hurry Sundown"b/w "What If They Gave a War and No One Came" (from I Was Kaiser Bill's Batman)
| —
| —
| —
| —
|
| style="text-align:left" rowspan="5"|Non-album tracks
|-
| style="text-align:left"| "Green Kentucky Hills of Home"b/w "You Mean All the World to Me"
| —
| —
| —
| —
|
|-
| style="text-align:left"| "In the Mirror of Your Mind"b/w "The Swanee Is a River"
| —
| —
| —
| —
|
|-
| style="text-align:left"| "Ride Ride Ride"b/w "By the Time I Get to Phoenix"
| —
| —
| —
| —
|
|-
| rowspan="3"|1968
| style="text-align:left"| "It's a Happening World"b/w "Emily"
| —
| —
| —
| —
|
|-
| style="text-align:left"| "Gonna Find Me a Bluebird"b/w "Deafening Roar of Silence"
| —
| —
| —
| —
|
| style="text-align:left"|Look Ahead
|-
| style="text-align:left"| "September Blue"b/w "Beyond Our Memory" (Non-album track)
| —
| 33
| —
| —
|
| style="text-align:left"|You've Lost That Lovin' Feelin'''
|-
| rowspan="3"|1969
| style="text-align:left"| "July You're a Woman"b/w "Break My Mind"
| 100
| 23
| —
| —
|
| style="text-align:left" rowspan="2"|Departure|-
| style="text-align:left"| "What's Gnawing at Me"b/w "Never Goin' Back"
| —
| —
| —
| —
|
|-
| style="text-align:left"| "Good Morning Dear"b/w "You Win Again"
| —
| —
| —
| —
|
| style="text-align:left" rowspan="7"|Non-album tracks
|-
| rowspan="2"|1970
| style="text-align:left"| "Now I'm Saved"b/w "What Are You Doing for the Rest of Your Life"
| —
| —
| —
| —
|
|-
| style="text-align:left"| "Everybody's Looking For an Answer"b/w "I've Got Confidence"
| —
| —
| —
| —
|
|-
| 1971
| style="text-align:left"| "C'mon Give a Hand"b/w "Where There's a Heartache"
| —
| —
| —
| —
|
|-
| rowspan="4"|1973
| style="text-align:left"| "The Sounds of Christmas"b/w "The Little Green Tree"
| —
| —
| —
| —
|
|-
| style="text-align:left"| "I Saw the Light"b/w "The Great Speckled Bird"
| —
| —
| —
| —
|
|-
| style="text-align:left"| "Tying the Pieces Together"b/w "Hayden Carter" (from I Love You More and More Every Day)
| —
| —
| —
| —
|
|-
| style="text-align:left"| "Golden Rocket"b/w "Everything Begins and Ends With You" (Non-album track)
| —
| —
| —
| —
|
| style="text-align:left"|I Love You More and More Every Day|-
| 1974
| style="text-align:left"| "Candy Lips"b/w "Young Girl"
| —
| —
| —
| —
|
| style="text-align:left" rowspan="2"|Texas Woman|-
| 1975
| style="text-align:left"| "Indiana Girl"b/w "Young Girl"
| —
| 36
| —
| —
|
|-
| rowspan="4"|1976
| style="text-align:left"| "Glory Train"b/w "U.F.O." (from Something Supernatural)
| —
| —
| —
| —
|
| style="text-align:left"|Non-album track
|-
| style="text-align:left"| "Texas Woman"b/w "It's Gone"
| —
| —
| —
| —
|
| style="text-align:left" rowspan="3"|Texas Woman|-
| style="text-align:left"| "Oklahoma Sunshine"b/w "Won't Be Home Tonight"
| —
| —
| —
| —
|
|-
| style="text-align:left"| "Lovelight Comes a Shining"b/w "Country Days and Country Nights"
| —
| —
| —
| —
|-
| rowspan="2"|1977
| style="text-align:left"| "Colorado Country Morning"b/w "Don't Want to Fall Away from You" (from Texas Woman)
| —
| —
| —
| —
|
| style="text-align:left" rowspan="2"|The Country Side of Pat Boone|-
| style="text-align:left"| "Whatever Happened to the Good Old Honky Tonk"b/w "Ain't Goin Down in the Ground Before My Time"
| —
| —
| —
| —
|
|-
| 1980
| style="text-align:left"| "Love's Got a Way of Hanging On"b/w "The Hostage Prayer"
| —
| —
| —
| —
|
| style="text-align:left"|Non-album tracks
|-
| 1984
| style="text-align:left"| "Let Me Live" (Christian chart)
| —
| —
| —
| —
|
| style="text-align:left"|What I Believe|-
|}

Sources for chart positions: Billboard and
[ All Music.Com]

 Non-US singles 

 German-language singles 

 Italian-language singles 

Videos
1995: Christmas with Pat Boone (Delta)
1995: 40 Years of Hits (Rhino)
2002: American Glory (The Gold Label)
2006: For My Country, Ballad of the National Guard (The Gold Label)
2006:  Thank You, Billy Graham''

References

Discography
Pop music discographies
Discographies of American artists